Shillong Chamber Choir is an Indian chamber choir based in Shillong, Meghalaya that was founded in 2001. It received fame after winning the reality talent show, India's Got Talent (Season 2) in October 2010, on Colours TV, part of the Got Talent franchise, where it performed western chorals, as well as choral-style revamps of Hindi film (Bollywood) classics.

The choir participated in the 6th World Choir Games held at Shaoxing China (Shanghai) in July 2010 and was awarded Gold in all three categories: Musica Sacra, Gospel and Popular.

History
The choir made its debut performance at Pinewood Hotel in Shillong, dubbed as rock capital of India on 14 and 15 January 2001, with Neil Nongkynrih, a concert pianist as their conductor, and continued performing ever since. Nongkynrih studied at the Guildhall School of Music and Trinity College, London, and thereafter worked as a concert pianist for 13 years in Europe, before returning to Shillong in Meghalaya and starting the choir with local youth.

Today, it has 25 members including 15 singers, and other musicians and soloist, apart from conductor Nongkynrih. The choir’s repertoire includes works of western classical music, including Handel, Bach, Gershwin and Mozart, from hits by rock group Queen, and Khasi folk songs and opera. Over the years it has performed in Britain, Poland, Switzerland, Sri Lanka, Italy and the Indian cities of Delhi, Bangalore, Mumbai and Guwahati. In 2008 The Shillong Chamber Choir, a short film, was directed by Bollywood scriptwriter Urmi Juvekar, sponsored by Government of India.

The choir performed with the visiting Vienna Chamber Orchestra in March 2009 at Shillong and Kolkata, and was invited to perform in Sri Lanka. In July 2010, the choir was selected by ICCR for a Ministry of Development of North Eastern Region (MDoNER) sponsored trip to participate at the 6th World Choir Games ("Choir Olympics") held at Shaoxing China (Shanghai), where it was a lone Indian group amidst over 8,055 singers in 209 choirs from more than 60 countries, besides 14,072 Chinese singers; 260 choirs took part in choral competitions in 20 categories. Shillong Chamber Choir got gold diplomas (not the top awards) in three categories: Musica-Sacra (sacred music), Gospel (medley of few songs) and Popular (medley of Bollywood and English numbers). This came after its participation at the 2nd World Choir Games, in South Korea (2002), won it a silver award in the folklore category.

The choir participated in reality talent show India's Got Talent (Season 2) in September 2010, on Colours TV, after participating in Kolkata auditions, where they qualified and then survived the elimination rounds, where they sang Hindi film classics "Ajeeb Daastan Hai Yeh" from Dil Apna Aur Preet Parai (1960) and "Yeh Dosti" from Sholay (1975) in the semi-final round. The choir grew immensely popular in Northeast India and even Union minister of state for Rural Development, Agatha Sangma appealed to the people of the Northeast to vote for the group in the finals, when she visited the group in Mumbai. It went on to win the show finale on 2 October, where they sang a choral version of Hindi film song "Tu Aashiqui Hai" from Jhankaar Beats (2003), while drummer Teji Toko from Arunachal Pradesh came second, and Sikh martial arts group Bir Khalsa came in third.

The choir performed at President Pratibha Patil's presidential banquet at the Rashtrapati Bhavan on 8 November, for the U.S. President, Barack Obama and Michelle Obama, during their November 2010 state visit to India. They have already performed once at Rashtrapati Bhavan at the invitation of then president, A.P.J. Abdul Kalam on Christmas 2002.

On 28 and 29 October 2011, they performed again with The Vienna Chamber Orchestra in Shillong in a concert called "Bollywood Leitmotifs Also..." whereby melodies from Indian cinematic music were revamped for the choir and orchestra by their conductor Neil Nongkynrih. On 30 October 2011, they collaborated with Shankar, Ehsaan and Loy at the second Global Indian Music Awards (GIMA) which was shown on Colors channel. In 2015, Nongkynrih founder, mentor and conductor of the group was awarded Padma Shri, the fourth highest civilian award of India.

In 2013, they composed and sang four songs for their debut Malayalam movie, Goodbye December, and the song "madi madi", had aired live by BBC Radio.

The choir has been touring extensively all around India and the world gaining fame and recognition. Their future projects include involvement in music videos, movies and concerts all over India.

Shillong Chamber Choir often performs Christmas shows towards the end of the year. In December 2018 they performed in Chennai on 15 December at Phoenix Market City and 18 December at Khar Gymkhana.

Neil Nongkynrih died on January 5, 2022.

See also
 Prince Dance Group (winner Season 1)

References

External links
 Shillong Chamber Choir, website
 Shillong Chamber Choir, performances

Indian choirs
Shillong
Culture of Meghalaya
Participants in Indian reality television series
Got Talent winners
Musical groups established in 2001
2001 establishments in Meghalaya